Dodairagawa Dam is a gravity dam located in Gunma Prefecture in Japan. The dam is used for flood control and water supply. The catchment area of the dam is 27.6 km2. The dam impounds about 22  ha of land when full and can store 5100 thousand cubic meters of water. The construction of the dam was started on 1978 and completed in 1992.

References

Dams in Gunma Prefecture